Steve Boardman is a retired American soccer defender who played professionally in the Western Soccer Alliance, Major Indoor Soccer League and National Professional Soccer League.

Youth
Growing up, he played for the La Jolla Nomads soccer club.  He graduated from La Jolla High School and attended San Diego State University where he played on the men's soccer team from 1983 to 1986.

Professional
From 1986 through 1989, Boardman played for the San Diego Nomads of the Western Soccer League.  He was a 1987 First Team All League defender with the Nomads.  In 1987, he signed with the Los Angeles Lazers of the Major Indoor Soccer League.  The Lazers released him at the end of the season and Boardman moved to the Fort Wayne Flames of the American Indoor Soccer Association for the 1988–1989 indoor season.  He played from 1990 to 1992 with the Detroit Rockers of the National Professional Soccer League.  In 1992, the Rockers won the league title.   On October 22, 1992, the Baltimore Spirit signed Boardman to a one-year contract.  In June 1993, the Spirit traded Boardman to the St. Louis Ambush for Dan O’Keefe.  On December 2, 1994, the Spirit traded him and Tarik Walker to the Harrisburg Heat in exchange for Franklin McIntosh.  He finished the season with the Heat, then retired.  In February 1997, the Baltimore Spirit signed Boardman for the upcoming playoffs.  He again retired at the end of the season.

Coach
From 2001 to 2004, Boardman coached the soccer team at St. Paul's School in Maryland.

References

External links
 MISL: Steve Boardman

Living people
1964 births
Soccer players from San Diego
American Indoor Soccer Association players
American soccer players
American soccer coaches
Baltimore Spirit players
Detroit Rockers players
Fort Wayne Flames players
Harrisburg Heat players
Indiana Blast players
Los Angeles Lazers players
Major Indoor Soccer League (1978–1992) players
National Professional Soccer League (1984–2001) players
Nomads Soccer Club players
San Diego State Aztecs men's soccer players
St. Louis Ambush (1992–2000) players
Western Soccer Alliance players
Association football defenders
Continental Indoor Soccer League players
Los Angeles United players